was a Japanese actor and disc jockey, whose credits included roles in television, film, stage and musical theater. He reached prominence in Japan for his starring role in the 1970 film Eros Plus Massacre, which was directed by Yoshishige Yoshida.

Hosokawa was born and raised in Fukuoka Prefecture. He launched his acting career as a member of the theater company, Bungakuza, in 1964. He joined Bungakuza after leaving his university. He soon co-starred with actress, Nana Kinomi, in the musical, Show Girl. Additionally, Hosokawa served as a professor at Osaka University of Arts beginning in 2004.

Hosokawa accidentally fell and suffered head injuries at his home on January 12, 2011. He died of subdural hematoma at a hospital in Tokyo, Japan, on January 14, 2011, at the age of 70.

Filmography

Film
Zatoichi Meets Yojimbo (1970) – Goto
Ashita no Joe (1980) – Tōru Rikiishi (voice)
The Makioka Sisters (1983) 
Childhood Days (1990) – Shusaku Kazama
Welcome Back, Mr. McDonald (1997) – Jo Hamamura

Television
Kaze to Kumo to Niji to (1976)
Sekigahara (1981) – Naoe Kanetsugu
Ōoku (1983) – Tokugawa Ieharu
Sanada Taiheiki (1985) – Ōno Harunaga
Homeless Child (1994) – Eiji Ōtsubo
Kindaichi Case Files (1995) – Yuichiro Matoba
Hachidai Shōgun Yoshimune (1995) – Tokugawa Ienobu
Mōri Motonari (1997) – Ōuchi Yoshioki
Aoi Tokugawa Sandai (2000) – Ōtani Yoshitsugu

References

External links

1940 births
2011 deaths
Japanese male film actors
Japanese male television actors
Japanese male stage actors
Academic staff of Osaka University of Arts
Actors from Fukuoka Prefecture
Musicians from Tokyo
Gakushuin University alumni
20th-century Japanese male actors
21st-century Japanese male actors
Musicians from Fukuoka Prefecture